Randall Enrique Leal Arley (born 14 January 1997) is a Costa Rican professional footballer who plays for Major League Soccer club Nashville and the Costa Rica national team.

Career statistics

Club

International

Honours
Saprissa
CONCACAF League: 2019

Individual
CONCACAF U-20 Championship Best XI: 2017

References

External links

1997 births
Living people
Costa Rican footballers
Costa Rica under-20 international footballers
Belgian Pro League players
K.V. Mechelen players
Nashville SC players
Costa Rican expatriate footballers
Costa Rican expatriate sportspeople in Belgium
Expatriate footballers in Belgium
Association football midfielders
2019 CONCACAF Gold Cup players
Designated Players (MLS)
Major League Soccer players
Costa Rica international footballers